The General Authority of Zakat and Tax (GAZT) is a government agency under the Ministry of Finance in Saudi Arabia that is responsible for the assessment and collection of taxes and zakat, a form of obligatory almsgiving in Islam. GAZT was established on 14 June 1951 as department under the Ministry of Finance.

GAZT is headquartered in Riyadh and consists of the Taxpayer Department and 19 branches distributed over the main cities in the country.

References 

Government agencies of Saudi Arabia
Revenue services
Taxation in Islam
Economy of Saudi Arabia